The Comprehensive Nuclear-Test-Ban Treaty (CTBT) is a multilateral treaty to ban nuclear weapons test explosions and any other nuclear explosions, for both civilian and military purposes, in all environments. It was adopted by the United Nations General Assembly on 10 September 1996, but has not entered into force, as eight specific nations have not ratified the treaty.

History
The movement for international control of nuclear weapons began in 1945, with a call from Canada and the United Kingdom for a conference on the subject. In June 1946, Bernard Baruch, an emissary of President Harry S. Truman, proposed the Baruch Plan before the United Nations Atomic Energy Commission, which called for an international system of controls on the production of atomic energy. The plan, which would serve as the basis for U.S. nuclear policy into the 1950s, was rejected by the Soviet Union as a US ploy to cement its nuclear dominance.

Between the Trinity nuclear test of 16 July 1945 and the signing of the Partial Test Ban Treaty (PTBT) on 5 August 1963, 499 nuclear tests were conducted. Much of the impetus for the PTBT, the precursor to the CTBT, was rising public concern surrounding the size and resulting nuclear fallout from underwater and atmospheric nuclear tests, particularly tests of powerful thermonuclear weapons (hydrogen bombs). The Castle Bravo test of 1 March 1954, in particular, attracted significant attention as the detonation resulted in fallout that spread over inhabited areas and sickened a group of Japanese fishermen. Between 1945 and 1963, the US conducted 215 atmospheric tests, the Soviet Union conducted 219, the UK conducted 21, and France conducted three.

In 1954, following the Castle Bravo test, Prime Minister Jawaharlal Nehru of India issued the first appeal for a "standstill agreement" on testing, which was soon echoed by the British Labour Party. Negotiations on a comprehensive test ban, primarily involved the US, UK, and the Soviet Union, began in 1955 following a proposal by Soviet leader Nikita Khrushchev. Of primary concern throughout the negotiations, which would stretch with some interruptions to July 1963, was the system of verifying compliance with the test ban and detecting illicit tests. On the Western side, there were concerns that the Soviet Union would be able to circumvent any test ban and secretly leap ahead in the nuclear arms race. These fears were amplified following the US Rainier shot of 19 September 1957, which was the first contained underground test of a nuclear weapon. Though the US held a significant advantage in underground testing capabilities, there was worry that the Soviet Union would be able to covertly conduct underground tests during a test ban, as underground detonations were more challenging to detect than above-ground tests. On the Soviet side, conversely, the on-site compliance inspections demanded by the US and UK were seen as amounting to espionage. Disagreement over verification would lead to the Anglo-American and Soviet negotiators abandoning a comprehensive test ban (i.e., a ban on all tests, including those underground) in favor of a partial ban, which would be finalized on 25 July 1963. The PTBT, joined by 123 states following the original three parties, banned detonations for military and civilian purposes underwater, in the atmosphere, and outer space.

The PTBT had mixed results. On the one hand, enactment of the treaty was followed by a substantial drop in the atmospheric concentration of radioactive particles. On the other hand, nuclear proliferation was not halted entirely (though it may have been slowed) and nuclear testing continued at a rapid clip. Compared to the 499 tests from 1945 to the signing of the PTBT, 436 tests were conducted over the ten years following the PTBT. Furthermore, US and Soviet underground testing continued "venting" radioactive gas into the atmosphere. Additionally, though underground testing was generally safer than above-ground testing, underground tests continued to risk the leaking of radionuclides, including plutonium, into the ground. From 1964 through 1996, the year of the CTBT's adoption, an estimated 1,377 underground nuclear tests were conducted. The final non-underground (atmospheric or underwater) test was conducted by China in 1980.

The PTBT has been seen as a step towards the Nuclear Non-proliferation Treaty (NPT) of 1968, which directly referenced the PTBT. Under the NPT, non-nuclear weapon states were prohibited from possessing, manufacturing, and acquiring nuclear weapons or other nuclear explosive devices. All signatories, including nuclear weapon states, were committed to the goal of total nuclear disarmament. However, India, Pakistan, and Israel have declined to sign the NPT on the grounds that such a treaty is fundamentally discriminatory as it places limitations on states that do not have nuclear weapons while making no efforts to curb weapons development by declared nuclear weapons states.

In 1974, a step towards a comprehensive test ban was made with the Threshold Test Ban Treaty (TTBT), ratified by the US and Soviet Union, which banned underground tests with yields above 150 kilotons. In April 1976, the two states reached agreement on the Peaceful Nuclear Explosions Treaty (PNET), which concerns nuclear detonations outside the weapons sites discussed in the TTBT. As in the TTBT, the US and Soviet Union agreed to bar peaceful nuclear explosions (PNEs) at these other locations with yields above 150 kilotons, as well as group explosions with total yields over 1,500 kilotons. To verify compliance, the PNET requires that states rely on national technical means of verification, share information on explosions, and grant on-site access to counterparties. The TTBT and PNET entered into force on 11 December 1990.

In October 1977, the US, UK, and Soviet Union returned to negotiations over a test ban. These three nuclear powers made notable progress in the late 1970s, agreeing to terms on a ban on all testing, including a temporary prohibition on PNEs, but continued disagreements over the compliance mechanisms led to an end to negotiations ahead of Ronald Reagan's inauguration as president in 1981. In 1985, Soviet leader Mikhail Gorbachev announced a unilateral testing moratorium, and in December 1986, Reagan reaffirmed US commitment to pursue the long-term goal of a comprehensive test ban. In November 1987, negotiations on a test ban restarted, followed by a joint US-Soviet program to research underground-test detection in December 1987.

Negotiations
Given the political situation prevailing in the subsequent decades, little progress was made in nuclear disarmament until the end of the Cold War in 1991. Parties to the PTBT held an amendment conference that year to discuss a proposal to convert the Treaty into an instrument banning all nuclear-weapon tests. With strong support from the UN General Assembly, negotiations for a comprehensive test-ban treaty began in 1993.

Adoption
Extensive efforts were made over the next three years to draft the Treaty text and its two annexes. However, the Conference on Disarmament, in which negotiations were being held, did not succeed in reaching consensus on the adoption of the text. Under the direction of Prime Minister John Howard and Foreign Minister Alexander Downer, Australia then sent the text to the United Nations General Assembly in New York, where it was submitted as a draft resolution. On 10 September 1996, the Comprehensive Test-Ban Treaty (CTBT) was adopted by a large majority, exceeding two-thirds of the General Assembly's Membership.

Obligations
(Article I):
 Each State Party undertakes not to carry out any nuclear weapon test explosion or any other nuclear explosion, and to prohibit and prevent any such nuclear explosion at any place under its jurisdiction or control.
 Each State Party undertakes, furthermore, to refrain from causing, encouraging, or in any way participating in the carrying out of any nuclear weapon test explosion or any other nuclear explosion.

Status

The Treaty was adopted by the United Nations General Assembly on 10 September 1996. It opened for signature in New York on 24 September 1996, when it was signed by 71 states, including five of the eight then nuclear-capable states. , 177 states have ratified the CTBT and another nine states have signed but not ratified it.

The treaty will enter into force 180 days after the 44 states listed in Annex 2 of the treaty have ratified it. These "Annex 2 states" are states that participated in the CTBT's negotiations between 1994 and 1996 and possessed nuclear power reactors or research reactors at that time. , eight Annex 2 states have not ratified the treaty: China, Egypt, Iran, Israel and the United States have signed but not ratified the Treaty; India, North Korea and Pakistan have not signed it.

Monitoring
Geophysical and other technologies are used to monitor for compliance with the Treaty: forensic seismology, hydroacoustics, infrasound, and radionuclide monitoring. The first three forms of monitoring are known as wave-form measurements. Seismic monitoring is performed with a system of 50 primary stations located throughout the world, with 120 auxiliary stations in signatory states. Hydroacoustic monitoring is performed with a system of 11 stations that consist of hydrophone triads to monitor for underwater explosions. Hydroacoustic stations can use seismometers to measure T-waves from possible underwater explosions instead of hydrophones. The best measurement of hydroacoustic waves has been found to be at a depth of 1000 m. Infrasound monitoring relies on changes in atmospheric pressure caused by a possible nuclear explosion, with 41 stations certified as of August 2019. One of the biggest concerns with infrasound measurements is noise due to exposure from wind, which can affect the sensor's ability to measure if an event occurred. Together, these technologies are used to monitor the ground, water, and atmosphere for any sign of a nuclear explosion.

Radionuclide monitoring takes the form of either monitoring for radioactive particulates or noble gases as a product of a nuclear explosion. Radioactive particles emit radiation that can be measured by any of the 80 stations located throughout the world. They are created from nuclear explosions that can collect onto the dust that is moved from the explosion. If a nuclear explosion took place underground, noble gas monitoring can be used to verify whether or not a possible nuclear explosion took place. Noble gas monitoring relies on measuring increases in radioactive xenon gas. Different isotopes of xenon include 131mXe, 133Xe, 133mXe, and 135Xe. All four monitoring methods make up the International Monitoring System (IMS). Statistical theories and methods are integral to CTBT monitoring providing confidence in verification analysis. Once the Treaty enters into force, on-site inspections will be conducted where concerns about compliance arise.

The Preparatory Commission for the Comprehensive Test Ban Treaty Organization (CTBTO), an international organization headquartered in Vienna, Austria, was created to build the verification framework, including establishment and provisional operation of the network of monitoring stations, the creation of an international data centre (IDC), and development of the on-site Inspection capability. The CTBTO is responsible for collecting information from the IMS and distribute the analyzed and raw data to member states to judge whether or not a nuclear explosion occurred through the IDC. Parameters such as determining the location where a nuclear explosion or test took place is one of the things that the IDC can accomplish. If a member state chooses to assert that another state had violated the CTBT, they can request an on-site inspection to take place to verify.

The monitoring network consists of 337 facilities located all over the globe. As of May 2012, more than 260 facilities have been certified. The monitoring stations register data that is transmitted to the international data centre in Vienna for processing and analysis. The data are sent to states that have signed the Treaty.

Subsequent nuclear testing
Three countries have tested nuclear weapons since the CTBT opened for signature in 1996. India and Pakistan both carried out two sets of tests in 1998. North Korea carried out six announced tests, one each in 2006, 2009, 2013, two in 2016 and one in 2017. All six North Korean tests were picked up by the International Monitoring System set up by the Comprehensive Nuclear-Test-Ban Treaty Organization Preparatory Commission. A North Korean test is believed to have taken place in January 2016, evidenced by an "artificial earthquake" measured as a magnitude 5.1 by the U.S. Geological Survey. The first successful North Korean hydrogen bomb test supposedly took place in September 2017. It was estimated to have an explosive yield of 120 kilotons.

See also
 List of weapons of mass destruction treaties
 Comprehensive Nuclear-Test-Ban Treaty Organization
 Comprehensive Nuclear-Test-Ban Treaty Organization Preparatory Commission
 National technical means of verification
 Nuclear disarmament
 Nuclear-free zone
 Treaty on the Prohibition of Nuclear Weapons

References

Sources

External links

 Full text of the treaty 
 CTBTO Preparatory Commission — official news and information
 The Test Ban Test: U.S. Rejection has Scuttled the CTBT
 US conducts subcritical nuclear test ABC News, 24 February 2006
 International Physicians for the Prevention of Nuclear War, 1991
 Daryl Kimball and Christine Kucia, Arms Control Association, 2002
 General John M. Shalikashvili, Special Advisor to the President and the Secretary of State for the Comprehensive Test Ban Treaty
 Christopher Paine, Senior Researcher with NRDC's Nuclear Program, 1999
 Obama or McCain Can Finish Journey to Nuclear Test Ban Treaty
 Introductory note by Thomas Graham, Jr., procedural history note and audiovisual material on the Comprehensive Nuclear Test Ban Treaty in the United Nations Audiovisual Library of International Law
 Lecture by Masahiko Asada titled Nuclear Weapons and International Law in the Lecture Series of the United Nations Audiovisual Library of International Law
 Comprehensive Nuclear-Test-Ban Treaty: Background and Current Developments Congressional Research Service
 The Woodrow Wilson Center's Nuclear Proliferation International History Project or NPIHP is a global network of individuals and institutions engaged in the study of international nuclear history through archival documents, oral history interviews and other empirical sources.

 
Arms control treaties
Non-proliferation treaties
Nuclear weapons policy
Foreign relations of India
Foreign relations of Pakistan
106th United States Congress
Treaties concluded in 1996
Treaties not entered into force
Nuclear weapons testing
Treaties of the Afghan Transitional Administration
Treaties of Albania
Treaties of Algeria
Treaties of Andorra
Treaties of Angola
Treaties of Antigua and Barbuda
Treaties of Argentina
Treaties of Armenia
Treaties of Australia
Treaties of Austria
Treaties of Azerbaijan
Treaties of the Bahamas
Treaties of Bahrain
Treaties of Bangladesh
Treaties of Barbados
Treaties of Belarus
Treaties of Belgium
Treaties of Belize
Treaties of Benin
Treaties of Bolivia
Treaties of Bosnia and Herzegovina
Treaties of Botswana
Treaties of Brazil
Treaties of Brunei
Treaties of Bulgaria
Treaties of Burkina Faso
Treaties of Burundi
Treaties of Cambodia
Treaties of Cameroon
Treaties of Canada
Treaties of Cape Verde
Treaties of the Central African Republic
Treaties of Chad
Treaties of Chile
Treaties of Colombia
Treaties of the Republic of the Congo
Treaties of the Cook Islands
Treaties of Costa Rica
Treaties of Cuba
Treaties of Croatia
Treaties of Cyprus
Treaties of the Czech Republic
Treaties of the Democratic Republic of the Congo
Treaties of Denmark
Treaties of Djibouti
Treaties of the Dominican Republic
Treaties of Ecuador
Treaties of El Salvador
Treaties of Eritrea
Treaties of Estonia
Treaties of Eswatini
Treaties of Ethiopia
Treaties of Fiji
Treaties of Finland
Treaties of France
Treaties of Gabon
Treaties of Georgia (country)
Treaties of Germany
Treaties of Ghana
Treaties of Greece
Treaties of Grenada
Treaties of Guatemala
Treaties of Guinea
Treaties of Guinea-Bissau
Treaties of Guyana
Treaties of Haiti
Treaties of the Holy See
Treaties of Honduras
Treaties of Hungary
Treaties of Iceland
Treaties of Indonesia
Treaties of Iraq
Treaties of Ireland
Treaties of Italy
Treaties of Ivory Coast
Treaties of Jamaica
Treaties of Japan
Treaties of Jordan
Treaties of Kazakhstan
Treaties of Kenya
Treaties of Kiribati
Treaties of Kuwait
Treaties of Kyrgyzstan
Treaties of Laos
Treaties of Latvia
Treaties of Lebanon
Treaties of Lesotho
Treaties of Liberia
Treaties of the Libyan Arab Jamahiriya
Treaties of Liechtenstein
Treaties of Lithuania
Treaties of Luxembourg
Treaties of Madagascar
Treaties of Malawi
Treaties of Malaysia
Treaties of the Maldives
Treaties of Mali
Treaties of Malta
Treaties of the Marshall Islands
Treaties of Mauritania
Treaties of Mexico
Treaties of the Federated States of Micronesia
Treaties of Monaco
Treaties of Mongolia
Treaties of Montenegro
Treaties of Morocco
Treaties of Mozambique
Treaties of Myanmar
Treaties of Namibia
Treaties of Nauru
Treaties of the Netherlands
Treaties of New Zealand
Treaties of Nicaragua
Treaties of Niger
Treaties of Nigeria
Treaties of Niue
Treaties of North Macedonia
Treaties of Norway
Treaties of Oman
Treaties of Palau
Treaties of Panama
Treaties of Paraguay
Treaties of Peru
Treaties of the Philippines
Treaties of Poland
Treaties of Portugal
Treaties of Qatar
Treaties of South Korea
Treaties of Moldova
Treaties of Romania
Treaties of Russia
Treaties of Rwanda
Treaties of Samoa
Treaties of San Marino
Treaties of Senegal
Treaties of Serbia and Montenegro
Treaties of Seychelles
Treaties of Sierra Leone
Treaties of Singapore
Treaties of Slovakia
Treaties of Slovenia
Treaties of South Africa
Treaties of Spain
Treaties of Saint Kitts and Nevis
Treaties of Saint Lucia
Treaties of Saint Vincent and the Grenadines
Treaties of the Republic of the Sudan (1985–2011)
Treaties of Suriname
Treaties of Sweden
Treaties of Switzerland
Treaties of Tajikistan
Treaties of Togo
Treaties of Trinidad and Tobago
Treaties of Tunisia
Treaties of Turkey
Treaties of Turkmenistan
Treaties of Uganda
Treaties of Ukraine
Treaties of the United Arab Emirates
Treaties of the United Kingdom
Treaties of Tanzania
Treaties of Uruguay
Treaties of Uzbekistan
Treaties of Vanuatu
Treaties of Venezuela
Treaties of Vietnam
Treaties of Zambia
Treaties establishing intergovernmental organizations
Treaties adopted by United Nations General Assembly resolutions
Treaties extended to Aruba
Treaties extended to the Netherlands Antilles